District School No. 3, also known as Rock Creek Township School No. 3, Election School, and Martin School, is a historic school building located in Rockfield, Indiana in Rock Creek Township, Carroll County, Indiana. It was built in 1874, and is a one-story, rectangular red brick building with Greek Revival and Italianate style design elements.  It has a front gable roof and sits on a fieldstone foundation.

It was listed on the National Register of Historic Places in 1988.

References

School buildings on the National Register of Historic Places in Indiana
Greek Revival architecture in Indiana
Italianate architecture in Indiana
School buildings completed in 1874
Schools in Carroll County, Indiana
National Register of Historic Places in Carroll County, Indiana